The Campeones Cup is an annual North American association football match contested between the winners of the previous MLS Cup from Major League Soccer and the winners of the Campeón de Campeones from Liga MX. The competition was established by the two leagues in 2018.

Format
The Campeones Cup is contested by the winner of the MLS Cup, held annually in November or December, to decide the winner of the Major League Soccer season, and the Campeón de Campeones, held annually in July between the winners of the Apertura and Clausura tournaments in Liga MX. If a Liga MX team wins both the Apertura and Clausura tournaments, then the team automatically wins the Campeón de Campeones and will also compete in the Campeones Cup. The competition is hosted by the Major League Soccer team, based in either Canada or the United States, at the end of the summer. Its format is similar to the J.League Cup / Copa Sudamericana Championship, which is always hosted by the Japanese team.

The two leagues had previously fielded teams in the SuperLiga, which ran from 2007 to 2010, and currently compete in the CONCACAF Champions League. The inter-league partnership was spurred in part by the joint North American bid for the 2026 FIFA World Cup and a desire to improve the level of play in CONCACAF. The inaugural edition was hosted by Toronto FC at BMO Field in Toronto on 19 September 2018 and won by Tigres UANL. Atlanta United FC became the first MLS team to win, defeating Club América 3–2 in 2019.

The 2020 edition, which would have been hosted by Seattle Sounders FC, was cancelled due to the COVID-19 pandemic. MLS and Liga MX announced that the game would return in 2021. The return of Campeones Cup ended in a 2-0 Columbus Crew win over Cruz Azul at Lower.com Field in Columbus on 29 September 2021.

Results

Performances

By club 
As of the 2022 season, a total of eight teams have qualified for the cup. In the table below, teams are ordered first by the number of appearances, then by the number of wins, and finally by alphabetical order. In the "Years of Appearance" column, bold years indicate a winning Campeones Cup appearance.

By nation

See also
 Leagues Cup

Notes

References

External links
 Official website

 
International club association football competitions in North America
Recurring sporting events established in 2018
National association football supercups
Major League Soccer trophies and awards
Liga MX trophies and awards
2018 establishments in North America